Chipman/M.Y. Airfield  is located  south southeast of Chipman, Alberta, Canada.

See also
 Chipman Airport (Alberta)

References

Registered aerodromes in Alberta
Lamont County
Gliderports in Canada
Gliding in Canada